This is a list of the 34 present and extant marquesses in the peerages of the Kingdom of England, Kingdom of Scotland, Kingdom of Great Britain, Kingdom of Ireland, and the United Kingdom of Great Britain and Ireland which became the United Kingdom of Great Britain and Northern Ireland in 1922. Note that it does not mention any Marquessates held as a subsidiary title of a Duke. For a more complete listing, which adds these "hidden" Marquessates as well as extant, extinct, dormant, abeyant, and forfeit ones, see List of Marquessates.

They were a relatively late introduction to the British peerage, and on the evening of the Coronation of Queen Victoria in 1838, the Prime Minister Lord Melbourne explained to her why (from her journals): 
"I spoke to Ld M. about the numbers of Peers present at the Coronation, & he said it was quite unprecedented. I observed that there were very few Viscounts, to which he replied "There are very few Viscounts," that they were an odd sort of title & not really English; that they came from Vice-Comites; that Dukes & Barons were the only real English titles; — that Marquises were likewise not English, & that people were mere made Marquises, when it was not wished that they should be made Dukes".

Order of precedence

The general order of precedence among Marquesses is:
Marquesses in the Peerage of England 
Marquesses in the Peerage of Scotland 
Marquesses in the Peerage of Great Britain
Marquesses in the Peerage of Ireland created before 1801
Marquesses in the Peerage of the United Kingdom and Marquesses in the Peerage of Ireland created after 1801

Marquesses in the peerages of Britain and Ireland

List of heirs of Marquesses in the Peerages of the British Isles

Heirs apparent
Michael Paulet, Earl of Wiltshire, eldest son of the Marquess of Winchester
Alastair Gordon, Earl of Aboyne, only son of the Marquess of Huntly
Sholto Douglas, Viscount Drumlanrig, eldest legitimate son of the Marquess of Queensberry

Simon Petty-FitzMaurice, Earl of Kerry, elder son of the Marquess of Lansdowne
Thomas Townshend, Viscount Raynham, only son of the Marquess Townshend
Robert Edward William Gascoyne-Cecil, Viscount Cranborne, elder son of the Marquess of Salisbury
John Thynn, Viscount Weymouth, elder son of the Marquess of Bath
William Seymour, Earl of Yarmouth, elder son of the Marquess of Hertford
Richard de la Poer Beresford, Earl of Tyrone, elder son of the Marquess of Waterford
Edmund Hill, Earl of Hillsborough, only son of the Marquess of Downshire
James Chichester, Earl of Belfast, only son of the Marquess of Donegall
Thomas Taylour, Earl of Bective, elder son of the Marquess of Headfort
Christopher Browne, Earl of Altamont, only son of the Marquess of Sligo

Anthony Cecil, Lord Burghley, only son of the Marquess of Exeter
Daniel Compton, Earl Compton, only son of the Marquess of Northampton
James Pratt, Earl of Brecknock, elder son of the Marquess Camden
Benedict Paget, Earl of Uxbridge, only son of the Marquess of Anglesey
Alexander Cholmondeley, Earl of Rocksavage, elder son of the Marquess of Cholmondeley

Alexander Conyngham, Earl of Mount Charles, elder son of the Marquess Conyngham
David Brudenell-Bruce, Earl of Cardigan, only son of the Marquess of Ailesbury
Frederick Hervey, Earl Jermyn, only son of the Marquess of Bristol
Archibald Kennedy, Earl of Cassilis, only son of the Marquess of Ailsa
John Phipps, Earl of Mulgrave, elder son of the Marquess of Normanby

Robin Dundas, Earl of Ronaldshay, elder son of the Marquess of Zetland
Andrew Hope, Earl of Hopetoun, eldest son of the Marquess of Linlithgow
Ivo Gordon, Earl of Haddo, eldest son of the Marquess of Aberdeen and Temair
Henry Mountbatten, Earl of Medina, only son of the Marquess of Milford Haven
Julian Isaacs, Viscount Erleigh, only son of the Marquess of Reading

Heirs presumptive
Lord Anthony Hay is brother and heir-presumptive of the Marquess of Tweeddale
Lord Ralph Kerr is brother and heir presumptive of the Marquess of Lothian
Lord Anthony Crichton-Stuart, is uncle and heir-presumptive of the Marquess of Bute
Lord Timothy Tottenham is brother and heir-presumptive of the Marquess of Ely
Lord Reginald Vane-Tempest-Stuart is brother and heir-presumptive of the Marquess of Londonderry

Marquesses without heirs
The Marquess of Abergavenny is without an heir. His cousin David Michael Ralph Nevill is heir to his Earldom of Abergavenny.

See also
British nobility
Marquesses in the United Kingdom
List of marquessates in the peerages of Britain and Ireland

References

 Marquesses
Britain and Ireland
Marquessates
Marquesses
Marquesses